2014 in Korea may refer to:
2014 in North Korea
2014 in South Korea